Zimbabwe men's national softball team is the national softball team for Zimbabwe. The 1988 World Championships were held in Saskatoon, Canada.  The team played 13 games in the round robin round.  Australia beat Zimbabwe 2–0 in one game in this round.

References

Men's national softball teams
Softball
Men's sport in Zimbabwe
Softball in Zimbabwe